Jarvis Tyner (born July 11, 1941) is an American activist and the former Executive Vice Chair of the Communist Party USA (CPUSA). He is a resident of Manhattan, New York City. In 1972 and 1976, he ran on the Communist Party ticket for Vice President of the United States.

Life and career
Tyner was born in 1941 in the Mill Creek community of West Philadelphia, and graduated from West Philadelphia High School. He joined the Communist Party USA at the age of 20. After several years working in various industrial jobs in the Philadelphia area, where he was a member of the Amalgamated Lithographers of America and Teamsters, he moved to New York in 1967 to become the national chair of the DuBois Clubs of America, and later founding chair of the Young Workers Liberation League. He was the Communist Party USA candidate for vice president of the U.S. in 1972 and 1976, running with party leader Gus Hall.

Tyner has been a public spokesperson for the CPUSA, presenting its positions against racism, imperialism, and war. Tyner has also contributed to the CPUSA's Political Affairs Magazine and its People's World. He currently resides in the Inwood section of Manhattan, New York City.

Relatives 

Jarvis Tyner is the younger brother of jazz pianist McCoy Tyner.

References

External links 
 Ann Douglas, "A Tireless Fighter for Race, Class and Socialist Revolution," London: Morning Star, October 11, 2006. Retrieved September 4, 2009.
 Jarvis Tyner at NUT’s Race Advisory Committee 

1941 births
Living people
Activists for African-American civil rights
African-American candidates for Vice President of the United States
American anti-poverty advocates
American anti-racism activists
Communist Party USA politicians
Politicians from Philadelphia
Politicians from Manhattan
1972 United States vice-presidential candidates
1976 United States vice-presidential candidates
20th-century American politicians
West Philadelphia High School alumni